Tranquility is an unincorporated community in Green Township in Sussex County, New Jersey, United States. The area is served by the United States Postal Service as ZIP code 07879.

References

Green Township, New Jersey
Unincorporated communities in Sussex County, New Jersey
Unincorporated communities in New Jersey